The Arab Network for Quality Assurance in Higher Education (ANQAHE) was established in 2007 as a nonprofit nongovernmental organization.

The purpose of ANQAHE is to establish an international Arab network for quality assurance in higher education and to facilitate exchange of information and disseminate best practice in quality assurance; develop and support quality assurance agencies according to appropriate standards; and strengthen links between existing quality agencies across national borders.

ANQAHE works in association with the International Network of Quality Assurance Agencies in Higher Education and in connection with the Association of Arab Universities. 
It is based in Cairo, Egypt and its secretary general is Dr Tariq Alsindi.

The member organizations of ANQAHE are:

 Accreditation and Quality Assurance Commission (AQAC), Ministry of Education and Higher Education, Ramallah, Palestine
 Center for Quality assurance and accreditation for higher education institutions, Tripoli, Libya
 Commission for Academic Accreditation, Ministry of Higher Education, Abu Dhabi, United Arab Emirates
 Evaluation and Accreditation Commission (EVAC), Ministry of Higher Education, Sudan
 Higher Education Accreditation Commission, Amman, Jordan
 National Commission for Academic Accreditation & Assessment, Riyadh, Saudi Arabia
 Oman Academic Accreditation Authority, Muscat, Oman
 Private Universities Council, Safat, Kuwait
 Quality Assurance Authority for Education and Training (QAAET), Manama, Bahrain
 National Authority for Quality Assurance and Accreditation of Education (NAQAAE), Nasr City, Egypt

References

External links
• Official website

Organizations established in 2007
2007 establishments in Egypt
Organisations based in Cairo
Higher education accreditation
Quality assurance organizations
Educational organisations based in Egypt